Aung Htet (born Thet Zin Htay on 17 August 1990) is a Burmese singer and musician. In addition to singing, he plays the guitar and piano. He gained popularity while competing on the first season of Eipmat Sone Yar-Yar That Pan, a singing competition broadcast on Channel 7. During the competition, he was well received by audiences for innovative compositions of well-known Burmese songs. Aung Htet released his first album, Hey, Friend on 27 March 2016.

Born in a village located Demoso, Kayah State, Burma (now Myanmar), Aung Htet was raised in Magwe Region. He attended local monastic schools before moving to Yangon to complete his secondary education.

Discography 
 Hey, Helpmate (2016)
 Nhit (2017) )
 Flower Opened by Tear (2016)

Political activities

Following the 2021 Myanmar coup d'état, he participated in the anti-coup movement both in person at rallies and through social media. Denouncing the military coup, he took part in protests, starting in February. He joined the "We Want Justice" three-finger salute movement. The movement was launched on social media, and many celebrities have joined the movement.

On 12 April 2021, warrants for him arrest were issued under Section 505 (a) of the penal code by the State Administration Council for speaking out against the military coup. Along with several other celebrities, he was charged with calling for participation in the Civil Disobedience Movement (CDM) and damaging the state's ability to govern, with supporting the Committee Representing Pyidaungsu Hluttaw, and with generally inciting the people to disturb the peace and stability of the nation.

References 

21st-century Burmese male singers
People from Kayah State
Living people
1991 births